Dom Darreh Humian (also Romanized as Dom Darreh Hūmīān; also known as Dom Darreh) is a village in Kuhdasht-e Shomali Rural District, in the Central District of Kuhdasht County, Lorestan Province, Iran. At the 2006 census, its population was 176, in 40 families.

References 

Towns and villages in Kuhdasht County